Na Píobairí Uilleann (meaning "The Uilleann Pipers") is a non-profit organization dedicated to the promotion of the Irish Uilleann pipes and its music.

Organisation
NPU was founded in 1968 under the impetus of researcher and collector Breandán Breathnach and pipers such as Seamus Ennis, Leo Rowsome and Paddy Moloney (of the Chieftains), in order to promote the uilleann pipes and its music. A Tionól (meeting) of pipers in Bettystown Co Meath in April 1968 had been organised by Breathnach, Seán Reid and  Séamus Mac Mathúna, who wrote to some 100 pipers in Ireland and abroad for a gathering to revive piping.  Its headquarters are located at 15 Henrietta Street, Dublin, in a restored Georgian building with facilities for many activities. Membership of the organisation is now spread throughout Ireland, England, Scotland, Continental Europe, North America and Australia. Among the notable musicians associated with NPU are: 
Sean McAloon, piper and pipe-maker from County Fermanagh
Séamus Ennis, piper
Leo Rowsome, piper and pipe-maker
Mick O'Brien, piper from Dublin
Liam O'Flynn, one of the best-known pipers
Paddy Keenan, one of the top pipers
Sean Potts, served as Chairman from 1988 to 2002 and then as Honorary President to 2014.
Pat Mitchell, Dublin piper, teacher and collector of tunes.

Activities
The goals and activities of the organization are numerous. Regular classes on piping technique, pipe making, and reed making are taught to students of all ages and abilities. NPU is also making a major effort to re-master and re-release recordings of deceased masters of the instrument as well as record living masters. The organization offers a wide range of tutorial materials including DVDs, CDs, and books.

Recordings (selection)
 Johnny Doran Master Pipers - Volume 1, Na Píobairí Uilleann, 1988 
 Patsy Touhey The Piping of Patsy Touhey, Na Píobairí Uilleann, 2005 
 Robbie Hannan, The Tempest. Na Píobairí Uilleann, 2008. Vol. 3 of the series Ace and Deuce of Piping.
Paddy Keenan, Mick Coyne, Nollaig Mac Carthaigh: Piper’s Choice Volume 3, 2010

Books (selection)
 Reedmaking Made Easy, Dave Hegarty, Na Píobairí Uilleann, Dublin, 1983
 Music for the Irish Pipes, Joe Doyle, Na Píobairí Uilleann, Dublin, 2016

See also
Music of Ireland
Uilleann pipes

References

Vallely, Fintan (1999), The Companion to Irish Traditional Music, New York University Press. .
Ó Canainn, Tomás, Traditional Music in Ireland,  Routledge & Keegan Paul, 1978, .

External links
 Na Piobairi Uilleann Homepage
A rough guide to the history of the Uilleann (Irish) Pipes

Irish folk music
Music organisations based in the Republic of Ireland
Folk music organizations